Erethistoides sicula is a species of South Asian river catfish endemic to India where it is found in the Mansai River drainage.  This species is found in large, shallow, fast-flowing streams with a sandy bottom. The fish usually hide in clumps of aquatic vegetation.  This species grows to a length of  SL.

References
 

Erethistidae
Fish of Asia
Fish of India
Taxa named by Heok Hee Ng
Fish described in 2005